Harold Charlton (born 22 June 1951) is an English former footballer who made 106 appearances in the Football League playing for Middlesbrough, Hartlepool, Chesterfield and Darlington in the 1970s and 1980s. A midfielder, he also played non-league football for clubs including Frickley Athletic and Buxton.

References

1951 births
Living people
Footballers from Gateshead
English footballers
Association football midfielders
Middlesbrough F.C. players
Hartlepool United F.C. players
Chesterfield F.C. players
Frickley Athletic F.C. players
Buxton F.C. players
Darlington F.C. players
English Football League players